The following is a list of all IFT-licensed over-the-air television stations broadcasting in the Mexican state of Nuevo León. There are 38 television stations in Nuevo León.

List of television stations

|-

|-

|-

|-

|-

|-

|-

|-

|-

|-

|-

|-

|-

|-

Notes

References

See also
List of television stations in Texas for stations across the US border serving cities in Nuevo León

Nuevo